Indonesia competed at the 1968 Summer Olympics in Mexico City, Mexico.

Competitors 
The following is the list of number of competitors participating in the Games:

Sailing 

Men

Weightlifting

See also
 1968 Olympic Games
 1968 Paralympic Games
 Indonesia at the Olympics
 Indonesia at the Paralympics

References 
Official Olympic Reports

Nations at the 1968 Summer Olympics
1968
1968 in Indonesian sport